El Níspero is a municipality in the Honduran department of Santa Bárbara.

Villages 
The following villages are in the municipality:
 El Níspero
 Santa Cruz
 El Campo
 Nejapa
 El Paraíso
 El Tontolo
 Nueva York
 El Robledal
 San Jerónimo

Demographics
At the time of the 2013 Honduras census, El Níspero municipality had a population of 8,109. Of these, 97.26% were Mestizo, 2.24% White, 0.33% Indigenous and 0.16% Black or Afro-Honduran.

References

Municipalities of the Santa Bárbara Department, Honduras